The following is a list of radio stations that broadcast in Hungarian.

Radio broadcasting in Hungarian in Hungary

Nationwide and half-nationwide broadcasting in Hungary 

Kossuth Rádió (AM, FM)
Petőfi Rádió (FM)
Bartók Rádió (FM)
Nemzetiségi (AM)
Parlament (SAT)
Dankó Rádió (AM, FM)
Retró Rádió (FM)
Rádió 1 (FM) (radio station network (non-nationwide broadcasting), we can mainly listen central produced shows at all broadcast areas, but some non-Budapest broadcast area local news and traffic announcement, shows included (before 5 a.m excluded)
Karc FM (FM)
Magyar Katolikus Rádió (FM)
Mária Rádió Magyarország (FM)

Broadcasting in Budapest 

Rádió 1 96.4
Trend FM 94.2
InfoRádió 88.1
Tilos Rádió 90.3
Jazzy 90.9
Best FM 99.5
Sláger FM 95.8
Retro Rádió 103.3
Petőfi Rádió 94.8
Klubrádió 92.9
Bartók Rádió 105.3
Dankó Rádió 100.8
Manna FM 98.6

Radio broadcasting in Hungarian in Romania 

Radio Cluj/Kolozsvári Rádió - 24 hr/day
Radio Timişoara/Temesvári Rádió - 1+1hr/day
Radio Mureş/Marosvásárhelyi Rádió - 8hr/day
City Rádió - all day
Agnus Rádió - 8hr/day
Mária Rádió - 12hr/day
Rádió Gaga - mostly broadcasting in Hungarian
Prima Rádió - all day
Profi Rádió - all day
Star Rádió - all day
Sláger Rádió - all day
Mix Fm - all day
Radio Siculus - all day
Partium Rádió - all day
Vox FM - all day
Fun Fm - all day
Paprika Rádió - all day
Erdély FM - all day

Radio broadcasting in Hungarian in Slovakia 
Pátria Rádió - 10hr/day

Radio broadcasting in Hungarian in Serbia 

Radio Novi Sad/Újvidéki Rádió - all day
Szabadkai Magyar Rádió - all day
Pannon Rádió - all day
Rádió 90 - all day
Adai rádió - all day
Mária rádió - 12hrs
Panda radio
Max Rádió

Radio broadcasting in Hungarian in Slovenia 

Muravidéki Magyar Rádió - 15hr/day

Radio broadcasting in Hungarian in Austria 

Radio Burgenland - 0.5hr/day
Hit FM Burgenland - Tuesday, Thursday evening
Radio OP - Friday evening

Radio broadcasting in Hungarian in Ukraine 

Sion Rádió - all day
Pulzus FM - 12hr/day

Radio broadcasting in Hungarian in Croatia 

Eszéki rádió - 30min/day
Baranya rádió - 2X30min/week

Defunct radios 

Danubius Radio
Sláger Radio
Class FM
Neo FM
STAR FM
Roxy Radio
Music FM
Lánchíd rádió

See also
List of community radio stations in Hungary

References 

Lists of radio stations by language